The Academy of Canadian Cinema & Television's 7th Gemini Awards were held in March 1993 to honour achievements in Canadian television. The awards show took place at the Metro Toronto Convention Centre and was broadcast on CBC Television.

Awards

Best Dramatic Series
E.N.G. - Atlantis Communications. Producers: Jennifer Black, Jeff King, Robert Lantos, R.B. Carney
Neon Rider - (Virtue/Rekert Productions, Atlantis Films. Producers: Justis Greene, Danny Virtue, Winston Rekert, Michael MacMillan
Road to Avonlea - Sullivan Entertainment. Producers: Trudy Grant, Kevin Sullivan
Street Legal - Canadian Broadcasting Corporation. Producers: Nicholas Rose, Duncan Lamb, Brenda Greenberg

Best Short Dramatic Program
The Scales of Justice - Canadian Broadcasting Corporation. Producer: George Jonas
Kurt Vonnegut’s Monkey House - Atlantis Films, South Pacific Pictures. Producers: Michael MacMillan, Chris Bailey, Jonathan Goodwill 
The Ray Bradbury Theater - Alberta Filmworks, Atlantis Films, Ellipsanime, ITV Granada. Producers: Peter Sussman, Chris Bailey, Mary Kahn

Best TV Movie
The Scales of Justice - Regina vs Nelles - Canadian Broadcasting Corporation. Producer: George Jonas
Christmas On Division Street - Columbia Pictures Television, Higher Ground Productions, Morrow-Heus Productions, Procter & Gamble Productions, The Guber-Peters Company, Western International Communications. Producers: Colleen Nystedt, Tony Allard
Black Death - CTV Television Network, Libra Pictures, Saban Entertainment, Sunrise Films, Telefilm Canada. Producers: Steven Levitan, Lynn Raynor, Paul Saltzman, Edgar Scherick
Rapture - Paragon Entertainment, Tristar Pictures. Producers: Richard Borchiver, Jon Slan
School’s Out - Playing With Time, Inc. Producers: Kit Hood, Linda Schuyler

Best Comedy Program or Series
The Kids in the Hall - Broadway Video, Canadian Broadcasting Corporation. Producers: Lorne Michaels, Jeffrey Berman, Cindy Park, Joe Forristal
Maniac Mansion - Atlantis Films. Producers: Jamie Paul Rock, Eugene Levy, Barry Jossen, Peter Sussman, Michael Short
The Red Green Show - S&S Productions. Producer: Steve Smith

Donald Brittain Award for Best Documentary Program
Timothy Findley: Anatomy of a Writer - National Film Board of Canada. Producers: Don Haig, Terence Macartney-Filgate
Man Alive - Canadian Broadcasting Corporation. Producer: Halya Kuchmij
On the Eighth Day: Perfecting Mother Nature - Cinéfort. Producer: Mary Armstrong
Threads of Hope - Canamedia Productions. Producers: Jane Harris, Les Harris
Women in the Shadows - National Film Board of Canada, Direction Films. Producers: Christine Welsh, Signe Johansson

Best Documentary Series
The Valour and the Horror - Canadian Broadcasting Corporation, National Film Board of Canada, Galafilm. Producers: Arnie Gelbart, André Lamy
Brain Sex - Discovery Channel. Producers: Richard Price, Anne Moir, Pat Ferns
Millennium: Tribal Wisdom and the Modern World - Biniman Productions, KCET, BBC, Global Television Network. Producers: Adrian Malone, Richard Meech, Nancy Button, Michael Grant
My Partners My People - Canadian Television Network. Producers: Maria Campbell, Tom Radford, Andy Thompson
The Price of Power - Canadian Broadcasting Corporation. Producer: Noah Erenberg

Best Dramatic Mini-Series
Conspiracy of Silence - Canadian Broadcasting Corporation. Producer: Bernard Zukerman
Bethune: The Making of a Hero - Filmline International. Producers: Pieter Kroonenburg, Nicolas Clermont
The Sound and the Silence - Atlantis Films, South Pacific Pictures. Producers: Luciano Lisi, Jon Glascoe, Kim Todd, Michael MacMillan

Best Performing Arts Program or Series or Arts Documentary Program or Series
Cirque du Soleil: Nouvelle Expérience - Cirque du Soleil. Producer: Hélène Dufresne
Adrienne Clarkson Presents - Canadian Broadcasting Corporation. Producers: Adrienne Clarkson, Gordon Stewart
Canadian Brass: Home Movies - Rhombus Media. Producer: Niv Fichman
Standards - Canadian Broadcasting Corporation. Producers: Carol Moore-Ede, Jeremy Podeswa, Ingrid Veninger

Best Variety Series
The Best of Just for Laughs - Les Films Rozon. Producers: Andy Nulman, Gilbert Rozon
Country Beat - Canadian Broadcasting Corporation. Producer: Steve Glassman
The Tommy Hunter Show - Canadian Broadcasting Corporation. Producer: Lynn Harvey

Best Variety Program 
Brian Orser: Night Moves - Canadian Broadcasting Corporation. Producers: Sandra Bezic, Morgan Earl
6th Gemini Awards|1992 Gemini Awards - Canadian Broadcasting Corporation. Producers: Maria Topalovich, Joe Bodolai, Jon Nicholls, Peter Hayman, Sean Kiely
Friday Night! with Ralph Benmergui - Canadian Broadcasting Corporation. Producers: Ralph Benmergui, Joe Bodolai, Jon Nicholls, Peter Hayman
Happy Birthday Canada! - Canadian Broadcasting Corporation. Producers: Darlene Harber, Annette Antoniak, Ken Gibson, Gordon James
Howie - CBS, 3 Arts Entertainment. Producers: Peter Sussman, Morris Abraham, Michael Rotenberg, Sean Ryerson, Howie Mandel

Best Information Series
the fifth estate - Canadian Broadcasting Corporation. Producers: Kelly Crichton, David Nayman
For the Love of the Game - TSN. Producer: Aiken Scherberger
Venture - Canadian Broadcasting Corporation. Producer: Duncan McEwan
W5 With Eric Malling - CTV Television Network. Producer: Peter Rehak
Contact with Hana Gartner - Canadian Broadcasting Corporation. Producers: Alan Burke, Robin Taylor, Anne Bayin, Larry Zolf

Best Light Information Series
LIFE: The Program - Canadian Broadcasting Corporation. Producer: Duncan McEwan
Street Cents - Canadian Broadcasting Corporation. Producer: Jonathan Finkelstein, Janet Thompson, John Nowlan
Sunday Arts Entertainment - Canadian Broadcasting Corporation. Producer: Carol Moore-Ede
On the Road Again - Canadian Broadcasting Corporation. Producer: Karl Nerenberg
Prisoners of Gravity - TVOntario. Producer: Gregg Thurlbeck

Best Information Segment
For the Love of the Game - TSN. Producer: Aiken Scherberger
Venture - Canadian Broadcasting Corporation. Producers: Ben Matilainen, Nora Pratt, R. Gamble, Steve Thomson
Contact with Hana Gartner - Canadian Broadcasting Corporation. Producers: Bruce Griffen, Larry Zolf, Hana Gartner, Wes Blanchard, Michael Savoie
LIFE: The Program - Canadian Broadcasting Corporation. Producers: Stephen Bourne, Lon Appleby, Danny Cook, Sheldon Beldick
the fifth estate - Black and Blue - Canadian Broadcasting Corporation. Producers: Julian Sher, Jennifer Campbell, Dan Burke, Gerry Wagschal, Roger Leclerc

Best Animated Program or Series
The Adventures of Tintin (TV series)|The Adventures of Tintin - Nelvana, Ellipsanime. Producers: Michael Hirsh, Patrick Loubert, Clive A. Smith
Nilus the Sandman: The Boy Who Dreamed Christmas - Cambium Film & Video Productions, Delaney & Friends Cartoon Productions. Producers: Chris Delaney, Arnie Zipursky, Bruce Glawson

Best Youth Program or Series
The Odyssey - Water Street Pictures. Producer: Michael Chechik
Degrassi Talks - Playing With Time, Inc. Producers: Kit Hood, Linda Schuyler
Road Movies - Why Not Productions, Canadian Broadcasting Corporation. Producer: Barbara Barde
Wonderstruck - Canadian Broadcasting Corporation. Producers: Bob McDonald, Debra Mathews, Helga Haberfellner, Lasley Williams, Paul Goodman

Best Children’s Program or Series
Shining Time Station - Catalyst Entertainment, YTV. Producers: Rick Siggelkow, Britt Allcroft, Nancy Chapelle
Alligator Pie - Canadian Broadcasting Corporation. Producer: Cindy Hamon-Hill
Lost in the Barrens II: The Curse of the Viking Grave - Atlantis Films. Producers: Michael J. F. Scott, Derek Mazur, Daphne Ballon, Seaton McLean, Michael MacMillan
OWL/TV - Canadian Television Network. Producers: Annabel Slaight, Christopher Howard

Best Sports Program or Series
Sports Weekend - Canadian Broadcasting Corporation. Producers: Joan Mead, Doug Sellars
Bob Izumi’s Real Fishing Show - Izumi’s Outdoor. Producers: Douglas Volpel, Wayne Izumi
CBC at Six - Canadian Broadcasting Corporation. Producers: Bill Kendrick, Bruce Dowbiggin
CTV Sports Presents Year in Review - Canadian Television Network. Producers: Dean Bender, Jeffrey Mather, Doug Beeforth, John McLarty, Laura Mellanby
SportsCentre - TSN. Producer: Michael Day

Best Special Event Coverage
1992 Olympic Winter Games - Canadian Broadcasting Corporation. Producers: Robert Moir, Doug Sellars
Canada In Question - Canadian Television Network. Producers: Tobias Fisher, Robert Conroy, Louis Cooper, Eric Morrison, Fiona Conway
CBC News National Town Hall - Canadian Broadcasting Corporation. Producers: Slawko Klymkiw, Elly Alboim, Christopher Waddell

Best Direction in a Dramatic Program or Mini-Series
Francis Mankiewicz - Conspiracy of Silence (CBC) 
John Kent Harrison - The Sound and the Silence (Atlantis Films/South Pacific Pictures)
Allan Kroeker - Forever Knight (Paragon Entertainment)
Eric Till - To Catch a Killer (Creative Entertainment Group/Libra Pictures/Telestories Entertainment)
George Bloomfield - Wojeck: Out of the Fire (CBC)

Best Direction in a Dramatic or Comedy Series
Allan King - Road to Avonlea (Sullivan Entertainment)
Bruce Pittman - Beyond Reality (Paragon Entertainment)
René Bonnière - E.N.G. - Public Enemy (Atlantis Communications)
George Bloomfield - Neon Rider (Virtue/Rekert Productions/Atlantis Films)
Paul Lynch - Top Cops - John Kosek/Richard Voorhees/Doug Edgington/David Miles (C.B.I. of Canada)

Best Direction in a Variety or Performing Arts Program or Series
Jacques Payette - Cirque du Soleil: Nouvelle Expérience (Cirque du Soleil)
Jeremy Podeswa - Standards (CBC)
Joan Tosoni - 6th Gemini Awards|1992 Gemini Awards (CBC)
Don Marks - Indian Time 2: Fly with Eagles (Global TV)
Barbara Willis Sweete, Bernar Hébert - Pictures on the Edge (CBC)

Best Direction in an Information or Documentary Program or Series
Brian McKenna - The Valour and the Horror (CBC/NFB/Galafilm)
Susan Teskey - the fifth estate (CBC)
Alan Gough - A Promise Kept (Signboard Hill Productions)
John Paskievich - Sedna: The Making of a Myth (NFB)
Larry Weinstein - Life and Death of Manuel de Falla (Rhombus Media

Best Writing in a Dramatic Program or Mini-Series
Suzette Couture - Conspiracy of Silence (CBC) 
Ted Allan - Bethune: The Making of a Hero (Filmline International)
Stan Daniels - Kurt Vonnegut's Monkey House (Atlantis Films/South Pacific Pictures)
Heather Conkie - Beethoven Lives Upstairs (Devine Entertainment)
Douglas Bowie - Grand Larceny (CBC)

Best Writing in a Dramatic Series
David Barlow - Max Glick (Sunrise Films/FosterFilm Productions)
Heather Conkie - Road to Avonlea (Sullivan Entertainment)
Charles Lazer - Road to Avonlea - Another Point of View (Sullivan Entertainment)
Peter Lauterman, Angelo Stea - E.N.G. (Atlantis Communications)
Wayne Grigsby, Barbara Samuels - E.N.G. - The Best Defence (Atlantis Communications)

Best Writing in a Comedy or Variety Program or Series
Mary Walsh, Cathy Jones, Tommy Sexton, Greg Malone - Codco (Salter Street Films)
Louise Moon, Roger Fredericks - Street Cents (CBC)
Bernard Rothman, Shari Lewis - Lamb Chop's Play-Along (Paragon Entertainment) 
Mike MacDonald - My House, My Rules (Howard Lapides Productions)
Martha Kehoe - Country Gold (CBC)

Best Writing in an Information/Documentary Program or Series
Brian McKenna, Terence McKenna - The Valour and the Horror (CBC/NFB/Galafilm)
Linden MacIntyre - the fifth estate (Canadian Broadcasting Corporation)
Susan Teskey - the fifth estate (Canadian Broadcasting Corporation)
Susan A'Court, Barry Ewart Stone - All Ways Welcome (TVOntario)
Terence McKenna, Jerry Thompson - The Journal (Canadian Broadcasting Corporation)

Best Performance by an Actor in a Leading Role in a Dramatic Program or Mini-Series
Michael Mahonen - Conspiracy of Silence (CBC)
Stephen Ouimette - Conspiracy of Silence (CBC)
Michael Riley - To Catch a Killer (Creative Entertainment Group/Libra Pictures/Telestories Entertainment)
Neil Munro - Beethoven Lives Upstairs (Devine Entertainment)

Best Performance by an Actress in a Leading Role in a Dramatic Program or Mini-Series
Kate Nelligan - The Diamond Fleece (Moving Image Productions)
Vanessa Vaughan - The Sound and the Silence (Atlantis Films/South Pacific Pictures)
Jennifer Phipps - Ann & Maddy
Jennifer Dale - Grand Larceny (CBC)

Best Performance by an Actor in a Continuing Leading Dramatic Role
Cedric Smith - Road to Avonlea (Sullivan Entertainment)
C. David Johnson - Street Legal (CBC)
Zachary Bennett - Road to Avonlea (Sullivan Entertainment)
Eric Peterson - Street Legal (CBC)
Art Hindle - E.N.G. (Atlantis Communications)
Geraint Wyn Davies - Forever Knight (Paragon Entertainment)

Best Performance by an Actress in a Continuing Leading Dramatic Role
Sara Botsford - E.N.G. (Atlantis Communications)
Sarah Polley - Road to Avonlea (Sullivan Entertainment)
Sonja Smits - Street Legal (CBC)
Cynthia Dale - Street Legal (CBC)

Best Guest Performance in a Series by an Actor or Actress
Kate Nelligan - Road to Avonlea - After the Honeymoon (Sullivan Entertainment)
Robin Gammell - E.N.G. (Atlantis Communications)
Martin Short - Maniac Mansion (Atlantis Films)
Ocean Hellman - Neon Rider - Labour Day (Virtue/Rekert Productions/Atlantis Films)
Barry Flatman - Secret Service (Secret Vision)

Best Performance by an Actor in a Supporting Role
Jonathan Welsh - E.N.G. (Atlantis Communications)
Nigel Bennett - Forever Knight (Paragon Entertainment)
Robert Joy - Grand Larceny (CBC)
Kenneth Welsh - Grand Larceny (CBC)
Michael Mahonen - Road to Avonlea (Sullivan Entertainment)

Best Performance by an Actress in a Supporting Role
Brooke Johnson - Conspiracy of Silence (CBC) 
Catherine Disher - Grand Larceny (CBC)
Theresa Tova - E.N.G. (Atlantis Communications)
Lally Cadeau - Road to Avonlea (Sullivan Entertainment)
Patricia Hamilton - Road to Avonlea (Sullivan Entertainment)

Best Performance in a Comedy Program or Series
Scott Thompson, Mark McKinney, Kevin McDonald, Bruce McCulloch, Dave Foley - The Kids in the Hall (Broadway Video/CBC)
Michel Courtemanche, The Vestibules - The Best of Just for Laughs (Les Films Rozon)
Mike MacDonald - My House, My Rules (Howard Lapides Productions)

Best Performance or Host in a Variety Program or Series
Anne Murray, k.d. lang - Country Gold (CBC)
Katarina Witt, Brian Orser - Brian Orser: Night Moves (CBC)
Howie Mandel - Howie (CBS/3 Arts Entertainment)
Ofra Harnoy, Loreena McKennitt - Juno Awards of 1992 (CBC)
Michelle Wright - Michelle (CBC)

Best Performance in a Performing Arts Program or Series
Barenaked Ladies - Ear to the Ground - Barenaked Ladies (CBC)
Meryn Cadell - Ear to the Ground - Barenaked Ladies (CBC)
Shirley Douglas - Passage of the Heart (Black Hat Productions)

Gordon Sinclair Award for Broadcast Journalism
Linden MacIntyre - the fifth estate (CBC)
Victor Malarek - the fifth estate (CBC)
Peter Mansbridge - The National - CBC News (CBC)

Best Reportage
Patrick Brown - The National - CBC News (CBC)
Joe Schlesinger - The National - CBC News (CBC)
Ross Rutherford - CBC News - Strangers at the Door (CBC)
Ross Rutherford - CBC News - Trouble in the Air (CBC)

Best Anchor or Interviewer
Peter Mansbridge - CBC News National Town Hall (CBC)
Hana Gartner - Contact with Hana Gartner (CBC)
Hana Gartner - the fifth estate (Canadian Broadcasting Corporation)
Linden MacIntyre - the fifth estate (Canadian Broadcasting Corporation)
Lloyd Robertson - CTV News (CTV)

Best Host in a Light Information, Variety or Performing Arts Program or Series
Adrienne Clarkson - Adrienne Clarkson Presents (CBC)
Tommy Hunter - The Tommy Hunter Show (CBC)
Bob Izumi - Bob Izumi’s Real Fishing Show (Izumi’s Outdoor)
Leslie Nielsen - 12th Genie Awards (CBC)
Shirley Solomon - The Shirley Show - The New Rape Law (Adderley Productions)

Best Sportscaster
Bruce Dowbiggin - CBC at Six (CBC)
Ron MacLean - Albertville 1992: XVI Olympic Winter Games (CBC)
Brian Williams - Albertville 1992: XVI Olympic Winter Games (CBC)
Jim Hughson - (TSN)
Buck Martinez - (TSN)

Best Photography in a Dramatic Program or Series
Rene Ohashi - The Sound and the Silence (Atlantis Films/South Pacific Pictures)
Raoul Coutard, Mike Molloy - Bethune: The Making of a Hero (Filmline International)
Paul Sarossy - Grand Larceny (CBC)
Albert J. Dunk - Forever Knight (Paragon Entertainment)
Malcolm Cross - Street Legal (CBC)

Best Photography in a Comedy, Variety or Performing Arts Program or Series
Sylvain Brault - Cirque du Soleil: Nouvelle Expérience (Cirque du Soleil)
Donald Spence, James Cassidy, Richard Fox - Adrienne Clarkson Presents (Canadian Broadcasting Corporation)
Peter Bower, Adam Swica - Canadian Brass (Rhombus Media)
Gilray Densham - Brian Orser: Night Moves (CBC)
Gilray Densham - Juno Awards of 1992 (CBC)

Best Photography in an Information/Documentary Program or Series
Vic Sarin, Michael Boland - Millennium: Tribal Wisdom and the Modern World (Biniman Productions/KCET/BBC/Global TV)
John Grierson - A Promise Kept (Signboard Hill Productions)
Bob Gibson - Flight of the Sky Hawks (Yaletown Productions)
Steve Adamcryck - Man Alive (CBC)
Damir I. Chytil - The Nahanni and Rebekah Dawn (CBC)

Best News Photography
Steve Rendall - The National - CBC News (CBC)
Danny Ross - The National - CBC News (CBC)
Dave Hall - The National - CBC News (CBC)

Best Picture Editing in a Dramatic Program or Series
Ralph Brunjes - Conspiracy of Silence (CBC)
Rik Morden - Beethoven Lives Upstairs (Devine Entertainment)
Bill Goddard - Alfred Hitchcock Presents (Paragon Entertainment)
Yves Langlois - Golden Fiddles (South Australian Film Corporation/Wacko Entertainment)
Gordon McClellan - Road to Avonlea (Sullivan Entertainment)

Best Picture Editing in a Comedy, Variety or Performing Arts Program or Series
Bill Goddard - Country Gold (CBC)
Christopher Cooper, Tom Joerin - The Kids in the Hall (Broadway Video/CBC)
Vidal Béïque - Cirque du Soleil: Nouvelle Expérience (Cirque du Soleil)
Dave Grein - Veronique: Wish You Were Here
Peter Henderson - The Tragically Hip - Full Fledged Vanity (CBC)

Best Picture Editing in an Information/Documentary Program or Series
Ron Trotter - Street Noise (YTV)
Daniel Sekulich - A Promise Kept (Signboard Hill Productions)
David New - Life and Death of Manuel de Falla (Rhombus Media
Jeth Weinrich, Jayne Morris Berry - Heartland (Seven24 Films/Dynamo Films)
Ron Piggott - Man Alive (CBC)

Best Production Design or Art Direction
Susan Longmire - The Sound and the Silence (Atlantis Films/South Pacific Pictures)
Ronald Fauteux, Michel Proulx, Enrique Alarcón, Ren Huixing - Bethune: The Making of a Hero (Filmline International)
Paul Ames, Armando Sgrignuoli - Grand Larceny (CBC)
Sheila Haley - Bordertown (Alliance Communications)
George Liddle - Golden Fiddles (South Australian Film Corporation/Wacko Entertainment)

Best Costume Design
Martha Mann - The Sound and the Silence (Atlantis Films/South Pacific Pictures)
Olga Dimitrov - Bethune: The Making of a Hero (Filmline International)
Dominique Lemieux - Cirque du Soleil: Nouvelle Expérience (Cirque du Soleil)
Michael Harris - Grand Larceny (CBC)
Glenne Campbell - Bordertown (Alliance Communications)

Best Sound in a Dramatic Program or Series
Dino Pigat, Gerry King, Brian Newby, Penny Hozy, Jim Hopkins - Conspiracy of Silence (CBC)
Susan Hammond, Greg Chapman, Steve Gorman, David Appleby, Andy Malcolm - Beethoven Lives Upstairs (Devine Entertainment)
Jacqueline Cristianini, Eric Batut, Paul A. Sharpe - Christmas On Division Street - Columbia Pictures Television/Higher Ground Productions/Morrow-Heus Productions/Procter & Gamble Productions/The Guber-Peters Company/Western International Communications)
Terry Gordica, Kevin Howard, Steve Foster, Chaim Gilad, James Porteous - Forever Knight - Dark Night (Paragon Entertainment)
Daniel Pellerin, Brian Newby, Jeremy Maclaverty - Grand Larceny (CBC)

Best Sound in a Comedy, Variety or Performing Arts Program or Series
Simon Bowers - Friday Night! with Ralph Benmergui -(CBC)
John Thomson, Rob Sim - Country Gold (CBC)
Mas Kikuta, Ian Dunbar, Dave Ripka, Simon Bowers, Peter Mann - Juno Awards of 1992 (CBC)
Peter Cracknell, Floyd Burrell, Peter J. Moore, Brian Radford - Paul Janz (CBC)

Best Sound in an Information/Documentary Program or Series
Alison Clark, Terence McKeown, Dino Pigat - Millennium: Tribal Wisdom and the Modern World (Biniman Productions/KCET/BBC/Global TV)
Keith Henderson - The Journal (Canadian Broadcasting Corporation)
Debra Rurak, David Husby, Paul A. Sharpe - Women in the Shadows (NFB/Direction Films)
William L. Campbell, Gael MacLean - Everest - Climb for Hope (Yaletown Productions)

Best Original Music Score for a Program or Mini-Series
Oscar Peterson, Warren ‘Slim’ Williams -In the Key of Oscar (NFB)
Mark Korven - Grand Larceny (CBC)
William Ross, David Foster - Golden Fiddles (South Australian Film Corporation/Wacko Entertainment)
Rob Bryanton, Jim Folk - Eli’s Lesson (Mind's Eye Entertainment)
Braun Farnon, Robert Smart - Heartland (Seven24 Films/Dynamo Films)

Best Original Music Score for a Series
Micky Erbe, Maribeth Solomon - Street Legal (CBC)
Graeme Coleman - Max Glick (Sunrise Films/FosterFilm Productions)
Fred Mollin - Beyond Reality (Paragon Entertainment)
John Welsman - Road to Avonlea (Sullivan Entertainment)
Milan Kymlicka - The Legend of White Fang (Cinar)

Special Awards
Canada Award: Peter Flemington, Rita Deverell - It's About Time
The John Labatt Entertainment Award for Most Popular Program - Trudy Grant, Kevin Sullivan - Road to Avonlea
Margaret Collier Award: George R. Robertson
John Drainie Award: Barbara Frum
Earle Grey Award: Barbara Hamilton

07
Gemini Awards, 1993
Gemini Awards, 1993